Om Prakash Puri  (18 October 1950 – 6 January 2017) was an Indian actor who appeared in mainstream commercial Hindi films as well as Bengali, Kannada, English, Punjabi and one Telugu film, as well as independent and art films and also starred in several international cinema. He is widely regarded as one of the finest actors in the Indian cinema. He won two National Film Awards for Best Actor, two Filmfare Awards and India's fourth highest civilian award Padma Shri in 1990. In 2004, he was made an honorary Officer of the Order of the British Empire.

He is best known for his author-backed roles in films like Aakrosh (1980), Arohan (1982), Ardh Satya (1983), television films like Sadgati (1981) and Tamas (1987),  light-hearted roles in Jaane Bhi Do Yaaro (1983) and Chachi 420 (1997) and several mainstream commercial films throughout his career. He had various collaborations with director Shyam Benegal and Govind Nihalani. Puri also appeared in non-Indian productions in the United States, Pakistan and Britain. In the 1990s, he appeared in My Son the Fanatic (1997) and the comedy drama East Is East (1999), receiving a nomination for the BAFTA Award for Best Actor in a Leading Role.

Early life
Puri was born to a Punjabi Hindu Family in Ambala. His father, Tek Chand Puri, worked on the railways and in the Indian Army. Puri's parents received no birth certificate and had no records, so his family was unsure of his birth date. But his mother told him he had been born two days after the Hindu festival Dussehra. When he began his schooling, his uncle chose 9 March 1950 as his "official" birthday. However, as an adult when he moved to Mumbai, Puri looked up when Dussehra was celebrated in 1950, to establish his birth date as 18 October.

Puri came from an underprivileged background. When he was six years old, his father who was a railway employee was put behind bars on allegations of theft of cement. This resulted in their family becoming homeless. To make ends meet, Puri's brother, Ved Prakash Puri, worked as a coolie (railway porter) and Puri worked in a local tea shop, did odd jobs and collected coal from nearby railways tracks to support his family. He and his brother's children were later brought up by a maid servant, Shanti.
 
While working, Puri continued to study. After his primary education, he joined the National School of Drama in Delhi to study theatre acting. A fellow NSD student who became a long-term friend, Naseeruddin Shah, encouraged Puri to follow him to the Film and Television Institute of India in Poona (present-day Pune). In an interview with The Times of India, Puri later recounted his family was so poor that he did not have a decent shirt to wear when he joined FTII. According to Shah, Puri was disappointed by his education at FTII, and also was unable to pay tuition fees—when he became well-known, the institute followed up the debt of ₹280, which Puri refused to pay due to the "impish thrill" of owing them money.

Career
Puri's first film was Chor Chor Chhup ja, a children's film. During this time, to make ends meet he also worked at the Actors' Studio, where future actors such as Gulshan Grover and Anil Kapoor would be his students.

Subsequently, Puri worked in numerous Indian films, as well as many films produced in the United Kingdom and the United States.

Puri made his debut in the mainstream films genre in the 1976 Marathi film Ghashiram Kotwal, based on a Marathi play of the same name by Vijay Tendulkar. It was directed by K. Hariharan and Mani Kaul in cooperation with 16 graduates of the FTII. He has claimed that he was paid "peanuts" for his best work. Along with Amrish Puri, Naseeruddin Shah, Shabana Azmi and Smita Patil, he was among the main actors who starred in what was then referred to as art films such as Bhavni Bhavai (1980), Sadgati (1981), Ardh Satya (1982), Mirch Masala (1986) and Dharavi (1992).

He was critically acclaimed for his performances in many unconventional roles such as a victimized tribal in Aakrosh (1980); Jimmy's manager in Disco Dancer (1982); a police inspector in Ardh Satya (1982), for which he got the National Film Award for Best Actor; a humble husband in Seepeeyan (1984), Vinod's uncle in Zamana the leader of a cell of Sikh militants in Maachis (1996); as a tough cop again in the commercial film Gupt in 1997; and as the courageous father of a martyred soldier in Dhoop (2003).

In 1999, Puri acted in a Kannada film A.K. 47 as a strict police officer who tries to keep the city safe from the underworld—it became a huge commercial hit. Puri's acting in the film is memorable. He rendered his own voice for the Kannada dialogues. In the same year, he starred in the successful British comedy-drama film East is East, where he played a first-generation Pakistani immigrant in Northern England, struggling to come to terms with his far more westernised children.

Puri had a cameo in the highly acclaimed film Gandhi (1982, directed by Richard Attenborough). In the mid-1990s, he diversified to play character roles in mainstream Hindi cinema, where his roles are more tuned to mass audiences than film critics. He became known internationally by starring in many British films such as My Son the Fanatic (1997), East Is East (1999) and The Parole Officer (2001). He appeared in Hollywood films including City of Joy (1992), opposite Patrick Swayze; Wolf (1994) with Jack Nicholson; and The Ghost and the Darkness (1996) opposite Val Kilmer. In 2007, he appeared as General Zia-ul-Haq in Charlie Wilson's War, which stars Tom Hanks and Julia Roberts.

He has worked in Hindi television serials like Kakkaji Kaheen (1988) (roughly meaning "Uncle Says") as a paan-chewing 'Kakkaji', which was a parody on politicians, and Mr. Yogi (1989) as a suave 'Sutradhaar' who enjoys pulling the protagonist's leg. These two serials underlined Om Puri's versatility as a comedian. He received critical acclaim for his performance in Govind Nihalani's television film Tamas (1988) based on a Hindi novel of the same name. He played comic roles in Hindi films like Jaane Bhi Do Yaaro which reached a cult status, followed by Chachi 420 (1997), Hera Pheri (2000), Chor Machaye Shor (2002), Deewane Hue Pagal, Chup Chup Ke, Kismet Connection and Malamaal Weekly (2006) and Oh My God. He was regular in films directed by Priyadarshan and Kamal Haasan.

His notable roles in commercial Hindi films included Drohkaal, In Custody, Narsimha, Ghayal, Mrityudand, Aastha, Hey Ram, Pyar Toh Hona Hi Tha, Farz, Gadar, Lakshya, Dev (2004), Rang De Basanti, Yuva, Singh Is Kinng, Mere Baap Pehle Aap, Billu, Kyunki, Lakshya, Dabangg, Bhaji in Problem, Khap, Bajrangi Bhaijaan, Ghayal Once Again. Puri was seen in the role of Mohammad Ali Kasuri in Road to Sangam (2009). In 2010, he appeared in The Hangman. In 2011 he was in the Indian action film Don 2.

He has also worked in some episodes of the TV series Aahat during the second season which was aired between 2004 and 2005 on Sony channel. Other notable television appearances included Bharat Ek Khoj, Yatra, Mr. Yogi, Kakaji Kahin, Sea Hawks, Antaral and Savdhaan India second season.

In 2014, he appeared opposite Helen Mirren in the comedy-drama The Hundred-Foot Journey. At the time of his death in January 2017, he was working on the Marathi film, 15 August Bhagile 26 January.

Several of his completed films released after his death including Viceroy's House and Tubelight.

Personal life
Puri married director/writer Seema Kapoor, the sister of actor Annu Kapoor, in 1991, but their marriage ended after eight months.

In 1993, he married journalist Nandita Puri, with whom he had a son named Ishaan. In 2009, Nandita wrote a biography of her husband titled Unlikely Hero: The Story of Om Puri. Upon the book's publication, Puri spoke of his anger at the inclusion of explicit details of his previous relationships. In 2013, Nandita filed an allegation of domestic violence against him, and the two opted for a judicial separation shortly afterwards.

His second wife reported that they kept a "secular house", but that "while Om is not ritualistic, he does not mind others being so". He took "solace in spiritual reading", particularly in the writings of spiritual teacher Eknath Easwaran, many of whose books he shared with friends. Puri seldom took politics seriously, and often found relaxation by cooking or gardening. In an interview to Rajya Sabha TV in 2012, Om Puri spoke about his interest in agriculture and cooking, and suggested that his dream was to open a dhaba by the name Daal Roti.

Controversies
In October 2016, Puri appeared for a debate on a news channel regarding a Hindi film producer's ban on Pakistani actors after the Uri attack. During the debate, he made insulting comments about Indian soldiers which led to heavy criticism on social media. However, Puri later apologised for his comments.

Death

On 6 January 2017, Puri died at the age of 66, after having a heart attack at his residence in Andheri, Mumbai. He was honoured at the 89th Academy Awards in memoriam segment for his contribution in world cinema.

Filmography

Film

Television

Awards and nominations

Civilian awards
 1990: Padma Shri – India's fourth highest civilian award.

Film awards

Other honours
 1998: Grand Prix Special des Amériques at the Montreal World Film Festival for exceptional contribution to the cinematographic art.
 2004: Honorary Officer of the Order of the British Empire for services to The British Film Industry.

References

External links

Veteran actor Om Puri passes away, Bollywood mourns his demise – The Times of India, 6 January 2017.

1950 births
2017 deaths
Punjabi Hindus
Punjabi people
Indian male film actors
Best Actor National Film Award winners
National School of Drama alumni
Honorary Officers of the Order of the British Empire
Recipients of the Padma Shri in arts
Film and Television Institute of India alumni
Indian male television actors
Male actors in Hindi cinema
Male actors in Gujarati-language films
Male actors in Bengali cinema
Male actors in Hindi television
Male actors in Kannada cinema
Male actors in Malayalam cinema
Male actors in Punjabi cinema
Male actors in Telugu cinema
Male actors in Marathi cinema
Indian male voice actors
20th-century Indian male actors
21st-century Indian male actors
People from Ambala
Male actors from Haryana
Filmfare Awards winners
Filmfare Lifetime Achievement Award winners